The Alfa Romeo Gloria is a concept compact executive car made by the Italian car manufacturer Alfa Romeo. It was first shown to the public at the Geneva Motor Show in March 2013.  Unusually, the concept was designed by 20 students of transportation design at the European Design Institute of Turin.

Technical details
The Gloria is a 4-door saloon with rear suicide doors, sitting on a long  wheelbase,  overall length,  overall width and  overall height.

References

 

Gloria
Cars introduced in 2013
Rear-wheel-drive vehicles
Compact executive cars
Sedans